Tan Hung Wee (born 29 August 1969), better known by his Chinese stage name Chen Han Wei, is a Malaysian actor based in Singapore.

Early life
Chen Han Wei grew up in Kampung Ungku Mohsin, Johor Bahru, Malaysia. Adopted since birth, Hanwei was raised in an impoverished background but  successfully completed his studies at Foon Yew High School, one of the country's Chinese independent schools.

Filmography

Film

Television

Awards and nominations

References

1969 births
Living people
Mediacorp
Malaysian male actors
Singaporean people of Teochew descent
Malaysian emigrants to Singapore
Malaysian television personalities
Singaporean television personalities
Singaporean male actors
People from Johor Bahru
Singaporean male television actors
Malaysian people of Teochew descent